Khalid Butt may refer to:

 Shaheen Khalid Butt, Pakistani politician
 Osman Khalid Butt (born 1986), Pakistani actor